Nikola Jakšić (born 17 January 1997) is a Serbian water polo player for VK Novi Beograd. At the 2016 Summer Olympics, he competed for the Serbia men's national water polo team in the men's event.

Honours

Club
VK Partizan
 Serbian Chanmpionship: 2014–15, 2015–16, 2016–17
 Serbian Cup: 2015–16, 2016–17

Ferencváros
LEN Champions League: 2018–19 ;runner-up: 2020–21
LEN Champions League 
LEN Euro Cup: 2017–18
LEN Super Cup: 2018, 2019
Hungarian Championship: 2017–18, 2018–19
Hungarian Cup: 2017–18, 2018–19, 2019–20, 2020–21
Hungarian Super Cup: 2018

Awards
 Sportsman of the Year of the JSD Partizan: 2015, 2016
 Young Athlete of The Year by the Serbian Olympic Committee: 2016
Third Top European Player in the World by LEN: 2019
Member of the World Team 2021 by totalwaterpolo

See also
 Serbia men's Olympic water polo team records and statistics
 List of Olympic champions in men's water polo
 List of Olympic medalists in water polo (men)
 List of world champions in men's water polo
 List of World Aquatics Championships medalists in water polo

References

External links
 
 

1997 births
Living people
Sportspeople from Belgrade
Serbian male water polo players
Water polo centre backs
Water polo players at the 2016 Summer Olympics
Water polo players at the 2020 Summer Olympics
Medalists at the 2016 Summer Olympics
Medalists at the 2020 Summer Olympics
Olympic gold medalists for Serbia in water polo
World Aquatics Championships medalists in water polo
European champions for Serbia
Competitors at the 2018 Mediterranean Games
Mediterranean Games medalists in water polo
Mediterranean Games gold medalists for Serbia
Universiade medalists in water polo
Universiade gold medalists for Serbia
Serbian expatriate sportspeople in Hungary
Medalists at the 2017 Summer Universiade